Gilbertsocrinus are an extinct genus of Paleozoic stalked crinoids.

These stationary upper-level epifaunal suspension feeders lived in the Devonian of the Czech Republic and United States, as well as in the Carboniferous of the United Kingdom and United States, from 416.0 to 345.0 Ma.

Species
Grinus tuberosus (Lyon & Casseday)

Description
Gilbertsocrinus are quite common crinoids with some unusual features. They have a flexible column, an unusual holdfast, tegmen appendages and minute arms.

References 

Extinct animals of North America
Extinct animals of Europe
Carboniferous crinoids
Devonian crinoids
Devonian first appearances
Carboniferous extinctions